Pseudodaphnella nodorete is a species of sea snail, a marine gastropod mollusk in the family Raphitomidae.

Description
This species differs slightly from Paramontana rufozonata (Angas, 1877) by a rather larger protoconch and by less prominent sculpture.

Distribution
This marine species occurs off Tasmania, Australia.

References

 May, Proc. Roy. Soc. Tasm., 1915, p. 84, pi. i., fig. 4.

External links
 

nodorete
Gastropods described in 1916
Gastropods of Australia